Shishani (Arabic: شيشاني "Chechen") is a common family name among the Chechen diaspora in the Arab world.

 Muhammed Bashir Ismail ash-Shishani, Jordanian statesman and major general
 Mohammad Omar Shishani (born 1989), Jordanian football player
 Abu Omar al-Shishani, Georgian militant, member of the Islamic State

Chechen-language surnames
Arabic-language surnames